Marcelo Adrián Carrusca (born 1 September 1983), is an Argentine-Australian former professional footballer who played as an attacking midfielder.

Born in La Plata, Carrusca started his professional career at Estudiantes de La Plata before moving to Turkish side Galatasaray in 2006. After spending a season on loan for Mexican club Cruz Azul, Carrusca returned to Estudiantes in 2009, playing one further season at the club and one on loan at Banfield. After one season with San Martín de San Juan, Carrusca moved to A-League club Adelaide United in 2012, where he played for five seasons.

Carrusca has represented Argentina under-20, including in the victorious 2003 South American U-20 Championship team and the 2003 FIFA World Youth Championship. He obtained Australian citizenship in 2017.

Club career
Carrusca is a product of Estudiantes de La Plata's youth divisions. He made his first appearance for the club in 2001, and played 103 league games (12 goals) for the team until 2006.

On 27 July 2006 he signed for Turkish club Galatasaray, opting for a five-year contract worth around €1.8 million. He played one year for the club, but on 25 July 2007 Galatasaray manager Karl Heinz Feldkamp reported officially that he did not wish to keep Carrusca on the team and asked the board to sell him in order to open space for a new foreign transfer.

After lack of first team appearances in Galatasaray, he was loaned for one year to Mexican Primera División team Cruz Azul for 2008–09 football season. He then re-joined Estudiantes to play with the team during the 2009-10 Argentine Primera División season and the 2009 FIFA Club World Cup.

On 8 July 2010, Carrusca joined Banfield on loan from Estudiantes to replace recently transferred left winger James Rodríguez.

Adelaide United
On 3 August 2012, it was announced Carrusca had agreed to sign with A-League club Adelaide United on an undisclosed two-year contract.

Carrusca scored a goal and assisted a further two in a man of the match performance during Adelaide United's 4–2 home win over Melbourne Victory on 7 December 2012, in Round 10 of the A-League.

On 23 May 2017, Carrusca became an Australian citizen, and can be included as a non-visa player in the A-League.

In July 2017 it was confirmed that Carrusca would not re-sign with Adelaide under new coach Marco Kurz.

Melbourne City
On 12 September 2017, A-League club Melbourne City announced it had signed Carrusca on a one-year deal.

Western Sydney Wanderers
On 11 January 2018, Carrusca and Melbourne City mutually terminated his contract, and he signed for Western Sydney Wanderers until the end of the 2017–18 A-League season.

Retirement
In May 2019, Carrusca announced his retirement from playing to focus on coaching. He now runs his own academy in Adelaide for children and young players.

International career
Carrusca played as an U-20 Argentina international. He scored 2 goals in 16 appearances and was a member of the Argentina Under-20 team at the 2003 FIFA World Youth Championship.

Honours
Galatasaray
 Turkish League: 2007–08

Adelaide United
 A-League Championship: 2015–16
 A-League Premiership: 2015–16
 FFA Cup: 2014

Argentina
 CONMEBOL U-20 Championship: 2003

Individual
 A-League PFA Team of the Season: 2012–13, 2013–14, 2014–15
 A-League All Star: 2013, 2014

Notes

References

External links
 Argentine Primera statistics at Fútbol XXI  
 Statistics at Irish Times
 

1983 births
Living people
Footballers from La Plata
Argentine footballers
Argentine expatriate footballers
Estudiantes de La Plata footballers
Galatasaray S.K. footballers
Cruz Azul footballers
Club Atlético Banfield footballers
Club Deportivo Palestino footballers
San Martín de San Juan footballers
Chilean Primera División players
Argentine Primera División players
Liga MX players
Süper Lig players
Expatriate footballers in Chile
Expatriate footballers in Turkey
Expatriate footballers in Mexico
Adelaide United FC players
Melbourne City FC players
Western Sydney Wanderers FC players
A-League Men players
National Premier Leagues players
Argentine emigrants to Australia
Expatriate soccer players in Australia
Argentina youth international footballers
Argentina under-20 international footballers
Association football midfielders
Naturalised soccer players of Australia
Marquee players (A-League Men)
West Adelaide SC players